Arthur Nelson Patrick (23 February 1934 – 8 March 2013) was a Seventh-day Adventist theologian and historian. At the time of death, he was an honorary senior research fellow at Avondale College in New South Wales, Australia. He also worked in pastoral ministry, evangelism, religion teaching, academic administration, and hospital chaplaincy for the Seventh-day Adventist church.

Biography 
Patrick graduated from Avondale College with a Bachelor of Arts (BA) in theology in 1957; then from the Seventh-day Adventist Theological Seminary at Andrews University with a Master of Arts (MA) and Master of Divinity (M.Div.) in 1972; followed by a Doctor of Ministry (D.Min.: Biblical Studies) from the Christian Theological Seminary in 1973.

From 1976 till 1983 he was the founding director of the Ellen G. White/Seventh-day Adventist Research Centre, located within the Avondale College library and jointly funded by the South Pacific Division of the Adventist church and the Ellen G. White Estate.

Patrick graduated with a Master of Letters (MLitt: Themes in the History of Women and Family) from the University of New England in Australia during 1984, and a Doctor of Philosophy (PhD) from the University of Newcastle, Australia, in 1992.

From 1992 until 1996 Patrick was the senior chaplain at the Sydney Adventist Hospital. During the following two academic years he was a visiting lecturer at La Sierra University in Southern California, teaching church history and pastoral ministry.

Patrick's writings attempt, in particular, to survey Adventist Studies (including study of the life and writings of Ellen Gould White, 1827–1915).

Patrick officially retired in 1998, whence one writer in Adventist Heritage magazine praised him for his contribution to the Seventh-day Adventist Church, adding Patrick's coworkers "will miss his warmth and his droll wit as well.". In retirement he served as chair of the Professional Standards Committee for the South Pacific Division; chair of Women in Ministry, Incorporated; and as a research fellow at Avondale College. He was active in writing and publishing and was a presenter at the 50th Anniversary Conference on the book Questions on Doctrine, held at Andrews University from 24–27 October 2007.

Publications 
Patrick wrote for a Seventh-day Adventist audience and published on his site as well as written chapters in books and articles for a range of Seventh-day Adventist magazines, including: Record, Signs of the Times, Ministry, Adventist Review, Adventist Heritage, Adventist Professional, Spectrum: The Journal of the Association of Adventist Forums, Adventist Today, Church Heritage, Lucas: An Evangelical History Review, and the academic journal Journal of Religious History.

Books 

 Christianity and Culture in Colonial Australia: Selected Catholic, Anglican, Wesleyan and Adventist Perspectives, 1981-1900 (Sydney: Fast Books, 1993). PhD dissertation
 The San: A Century of Christian Caring, 1903-2003 (Warburton: Signs Publishing Company, 2003); a centennial history of Sydney Adventist Hospital

See also 

 Seventh-day Adventist Church
 Seventh-day Adventist theology
 Seventh-day Adventist eschatology
 History of the Seventh-day Adventist Church
 28 Fundamental Beliefs
 Questions on Doctrine
 Teachings of Ellen G. White
 Inspiration of Ellen G. White
 Prophecy in the Seventh-day Adventist Church
 Investigative judgment
 Pillars of Adventism
 Second Coming
 Conditional Immortality
 Historicism
 Three Angels' Messages
 Sabbath in seventh-day churches
 Ellen G. White
 Adventist Review
 Adventism
 Seventh-day Adventist Church Pioneers
 Seventh-day Adventist worship
 Adventist Heritage Ministry
 Avondale College
 Ellen G. White Estate

References

External links 
 Ellen White and Adventism articles on SDAnet At Issue, which includes many articles by Patrick
 Re-visioning the Role of Ellen White, and other papers by Arthur Patrick
 Biography
 "The Questions on Doctrine Event: Contrasting Perceptions, Their Impact and Potential" paper, which includes many biographical details
 Articles by Patrick and about Patrick as cataloged in the Seventh-day Adventist Periodical Index (SDAPI)

Australian Christian theologians
Australian historians
Seventh-day Adventist religious workers
Seventh-day Adventist theologians
20th-century Protestant theologians
1934 births
2013 deaths
Australian Seventh-day Adventists
Andrews University alumni